Exit 57 is a 30-minute sketch comedy series that aired on the American television channel Comedy Central from 1995 to 1996; its cast was composed of comedians Stephen Colbert, Paul Dinello, Jodi Lennon, Mitch Rouse, and Amy Sedaris, all of whom had previously studied improv at The Second City in Chicago. In 1999 Sedaris, Dinello, Colbert and Rouse also created the Comedy Central show Strangers with Candy.

Humorist David Sedaris served as an additional writer for the series, sharing a single onscreen credit with his sister as "The Talent Family".

All of the sketches in the series are implied to take place in the fictionalized suburban setting of the Quad Cities.

Origin 
Sedaris, Dinello, and Rouse initially were approached about developing a sketch comedy show for HBO Downtown Productions after appearing in a comic play titled Stitches., written by Amy Sedaris's brother David Sedaris. The group had not performed together using the name Exit 57 before the series was proposed, but rather came together to develop the show. The series was filmed in New York; Stephen Colbert moved from Chicago, leaving Second City, for this reason. Jodi Lennon moved from Chicago, leaving The Annoyance Theatre.

Opening sequence 
During the show's cryptic opening sequence, the cast members are seen standing next to a broken down car on the highway. Soon they are picked up by a passing driver, who changes the radio station at the mention of a serial killer, and takes Polaroid pictures of his increasingly uncomfortable passengers. Growing suspicious, the cast demands to be let out. The car is then seen pulling off the highway at Exit 57.

A rendition of "If I Knew You Were Comin' I'd've Baked a Cake" served as the show's theme song.

Reception 
Despite having 12 episodes over the course of two seasons, the series met with a fair amount of critical acclaim before its cancellation, garnering CableACE nominations in 1995 for writing, performance, and best comedy series.

References

External links
 

American comedy troupes
Comedy Central original programming
1990s American sketch comedy television series
1995 American television series debuts
1996 American television series endings
Television series by HBO Downtown Productions